Mursal may refer to:
Mursal (hadith)
Murğuzallı, Azerbaijan
Mürsəl, Azerbaijan